Bohemia is a hamlet in Wiltshire, England, in the parish of Redlynch.

Hamlets in Wiltshire